A Teaching school is an Ofsted-graded outstanding school that works with other partners to provide high-quality training and development to school staff. They are part of the UK government's plan to give schools in England a central role in raising standards by developing a self-improving and sustainable school-led system.

They were first introduced by the coalition government in 2010, in a white paper  entitled "The Importance of Teaching". The intention was to replace the university-based teacher training programmes with a workplace-based school-centred and led approach which devolves responsibility for development and management of education to the schools.

References

Education in England
School types
State schools in the United Kingdom
United Kingdom educational programs
Education policy in the United Kingdom